The Brick Row Historic District in the village of Athens, New York is a small 
row of brick row houses that were built as apartments for the workers of 
the booming clay mining industry in the late 19th century to early 20th century. 
The row houses are found on Brick Row St. off route 385 just north of 
the village of Athens. The rows are close to the Hudson River.

It was listed on the National Register of Historic Places in 1980.

References

Residential buildings on the National Register of Historic Places in New York (state)
Historic districts in Greene County, New York
Houses in Greene County, New York
Historic districts on the National Register of Historic Places in New York (state)
National Register of Historic Places in Greene County, New York